Itapuí is a municipality in the state of São Paulo in Brazil. The population is 14,147 (2020 est.) in an area of 140 km². The elevation is 456 m.

References

Municipalities in São Paulo (state)